Roland Quignon (1897–1984) was a French art director. He designed the sets for more than fifty films during his career. He also directed four films.

Selected filmography
 The Dying Land (1936)
 The House Across the Street (1937)
 Women's Prison (1938)
 His Uncle from Normandy (1939)
 President Haudecoeur (1940)
 Happy Days (1941)
 Patricia (1942)
 My Last Mistress (1943)
 The Man Without a Name (1943)
 The Inevitable Monsieur Dubois (1943)
 Pamela (1945)
 The Black Cavalier (1945)
 Night Warning (1946)
 Rendezvous in Paris (1947)
 Cab Number 13 (1948)
 At the Order of the Czar (1954)
 The Count of Bragelonne (1954)
 Les enquiquineurs (1965)

References

Bibliography
 Crisp, Colin. French Cinema—A Critical Filmography: Volume 1, 1929-1939. Indiana University Press, 2015.

External links

1897 births
1984 deaths
French art directors
Film directors from Paris